Wheatland is an unincorporated community in Wheatland Township, Rice County, Minnesota, United States.

The community is located along Union Lake Trail, near its junctions with Jennings Avenue and Kent Avenue.

Nearby places include Lonsdale, Veseli, Montgomery, New Prague, and Millersburg.

References

Former municipalities in Minnesota
Unincorporated communities in Minnesota
Unincorporated communities in Rice County, Minnesota